The 1888 British Isles tour to New Zealand and Australia was a tour by a British rugby union team, known at the time as the "English Footballers", throughout New Zealand and Australia. Although a private venture not organised by any official body, this was the first major tour of the Southern Hemisphere undertaken by a European rugby team. It paved the way for future tours by teams which are now known as British and Irish Lions.

The team boarded the SS Kaikoura at Gravesend on 9 March 1888, returning to England on the same ship on 11 November. While in Australia and New Zealand the team played a number of state, provincial, and invitation sides, but did not play any international teams. They played 35 rugby matches, winning 27, drawing 6, and losing 2. Only four of the touring party had played, or would play, for their country; Seddon, Andrew Stoddart and Tom Kent for England, and Willie Thomas for Wales.

They also played a smaller number of Victorian rules (Australian rules) football matches, but the side had no prior experience of this before arriving in Australia. The team's legacy was honoured in 2013 when the team, along with initial captain Robert Seddon, were inducted into the World Rugby Hall of Fame.

Tour background

The 1888 tour was organised by three professional English cricketers, James Lillywhite, Alfred Shaw and Arthur Shrewsbury, but they could not obtain patronage from the Rugby Football Union who refused to patronise by the tour, though the RFU was happy for the tour to go ahead, provided there was no infringement of the rules of amateurism. The team was led by England's Robert L Seddon and took in 35 games, though no test matches against international opposition. Of the games played the tourists won twenty seven, drew six and lost two matches.

The tour was undertaken by Shaw and Shrewsbury as a purely financial exercise with little regard to producing a "British Isles" team, and the team itself is more often recorded as an English team. The two managers were not unfamiliar with touring sides, having organised cricket teams to Australia, and the rugby tour was a follow on from the financially disastrous England Cricket tour of 1887.

The rugby tour was not an economic success either and lost both managers money. Worse was to occur when team captain Seddon, drowned on 15 August in an accident while sculling on the Hunter River in West Maitland. The captaincy was then passed to Andrew Stoddart a future England rugby captain and Wisden Cricketer of the Year.

A further economic issue that related to the tour was the burgeoning professional movement that was gathering momentum in England at the time. Rugby players and clubs in Britain were divided by the growing belief that players should be paid for their time playing their sport. The growing popularity of the now professional Association Football was causing many, especially in the North of England, to challenge the amateur standing of the union code.

One of the catalysts to the split between amateur union code and the future league code, was when Jack P. Clowes, a member of the 1888 tour, was designated a 'professional' sportsman after he accepted £15 to buy equipment shortly before he left for Australia. The other players on the tour were then required to sign an affidavit to state they were not to be paid for playing rugby when in Australia and New Zealand. The tourists played in red, white and blue hooped jerseys and white shorts.

In addition to playing 35 game of rugby union, the Lions team also played 19 games of Victorian Rules Football (later known as Australian rules football). The Lions won 6 of the matches under the Australian rules, despite having no experience with the code prior to the tour.

The uniforms wore by the Lions in their first tour was made in striking thick red, white and blue hoops, white shorts and dark socks.

Touring party

Manager: A Shaw and A Shrewsbury

Full Backs
 Tommy Haslam (Batley)
 A.G. Paul (Swinton)

Three-Quarters
 Harry Collinge Speakman (Runcorn)
 Herbert Brooks (Edinburgh University), (Durham)
 Jack Anderton (Salford)
 Andrew Stoddart, (Blackheath)

Half backs
 Walter Bumby (Swinton)
 Johnny Nolan (Rochdale Hornets)
 W. "Willie" Burnet (Hawick)

Forwards
 Robert Seddon (Swinton) (captain)
 Charlie Mathers (Bramley)
 Sam Williams (Salford)
 Tom Banks (Swinton)
 Harry Eagles (Salford)
 Angus Stuart (Dewsbury – Scottish uncapped)
 W.H. Thomas (Cambridge University)
 Tom Kent (Salford)
 A.P. Penketh (Douglas), (Isle of Man)
 R. "Bob" Burnet (Hawick RFC)
 A. J. Laing (Hawick RFC)
 John Smith (Edinburgh University)
 Jack P. Clowes (Halifax)

Two-thirds of the touring party belonged to clubs that, within a few years, would defect to the Northern Rugby Football Union, founding the game of rugby league.

Results
Complete list of matches played by the British Isles in Australia and New Zealand:

Bibliography

External links

References

1888 rugby union tours
1888 in Australian rugby union
1888 in New Zealand rugby union
1888
1888
World Rugby Hall of Fame inductees